The Enipeas or Enipeus is a river in central Greece, tributary of the Pineios near Farkadona. Its source is in the northern part of Phthiotis, on the plateau of Domokos. Its course runs through several of the tetrades of ancient Thessaly, from Achaea Phthiotis in South through Phthia to finally flow into the Pineios in Histiaeotis.

The banks of the Enipeas constituted the scene of several important battles of history, including those of Cynoscephalae (364 BCE and 197 BCE) and Pharsalus (48 BCE).

Namesake
Enipeus Vallis, a north-south valley on planet Mars is named for this river (and valley), located in the mid-south of the Arcadia quadrangle.

References

Rivers of Greece
Landforms of Phthiotis
Rivers of Central Greece
Landforms of Larissa (regional unit)
Rivers of Thessaly
Landforms of Karditsa (regional unit)
Landforms of Trikala (regional unit)
Geography of ancient Thessaly